Al-Anbar Sport Club, is an Iraqi football team based in Al-Anbar, that plays in Iraq Division Two.

Managerial history
 Khamis Hammoud
 Atta Hassan

See also 
 2001–02 Iraq FA Cup
 2002–03 Iraq FA Cup
 2012–13 Iraq FA Cup

References

External links
 Al-Anbar SC on Goalzz.com
 Iraq Clubs- Foundation Dates

1987 establishments in Iraq
Association football clubs established in 1987
Football clubs in Al-Anbar